The 2016–17 Cleveland State Vikings men's basketball team represented Cleveland State University in the 2016–17 NCAA Division I men's basketball season. They were coached by Gary Waters who was in his eleventh season. The Vikings played their home games at the Wolstein Center with two games at Quicken Loans Arena and were members of the Horizon League. It was the 86th season of Cleveland State basketball. They finished the season 9–22, 5–13 in Horizon League play to finish in a tie for eighth place. In the Horizon League tournament, they lost to Youngstown State in the first round.

On March 7, 2017, head coach Gary Waters retired. He finished at Cleveland State with an 11-year record of 194–172. On March 24, the school hired former Georgia and Western Kentucky head coach Dennis Felton.

Previous season
The Vikings finished the 2015–16 season 9–23, 4–14 in Horizon League play to finish in ninth place. They lost in the first round of the Horizon League tournament to Green Bay.

Offseason

Departures

Incoming Transfers

2016 recruiting class

2017 recruiting class

Preseason 
In a poll of the League’s coaches, media, and sports information directors, Cleveland State was picked to finish eighth in conference play. Rob Edwards was selected to the Preseason All-Horizon League second team.

Roster

Schedule and results

|-
!colspan=9 style=| Exhibition

|-
!colspan=9 style=| Non-Conference regular season

|-
!colspan=9 style=| Horizon League regular season

|-
!colspan=9 style=|Horizon League tournament

Source:

References

Cleveland State Vikings Men's
Cleveland State Vikings men's basketball seasons
2016 in sports in Ohio
2017 in sports in Ohio